Henry Barrett (19 August 1837 – 10 September 1910) was an Australian cricketer. He played one first-class match for Tasmania in 1870.

See also
 List of Tasmanian representative cricketers

References

External links
 

1837 births
1910 deaths
Australian cricketers
Tasmania cricketers
Cricketers from Launceston, Tasmania